George Roman ( – ) was a professional American football defensive tackle who played three seasons for Boston Yanks/New York Bulldogs and New York Giants in the National Football League (NFL).

Roman was born in Rankin, Pennsylvania and grew up in Verona, attending Penn Hills High School in Penn Hills.

College and professional career

While in college, Roman was a star football player at Western Reserve, now known as Case Western Reserve University. He was also a member of the basketball and track teams.

During his professional career, he played three total seasons for Boston Yanks, New York Bulldogs, and New York Giants in the National Football League (NFL) from 1948 to 1950 before injuring his back. 

After his professional football career, he returned to Western Reserve University as staff, notably coaching the golf team in 1952 and 1953, and serving as an assistant football coach in 1952.

Roman was inducted into the Penn Hills and Case Western Reserve University athletic halls of fame.

References

External links

 Pittsburgh Post-Gazette obituary

1926 births
2002 deaths
People from Rankin, Pennsylvania
Case Western Spartans football coaches
Case Western Spartans football players
Case Western Spartans men's basketball players
New York Giants players